Lawrence Tupper Lydick (June 22, 1916 – December 17, 1995) was a United States district judge of the United States District Court for the Central District of California.

Education and career

Born in San Diego, California, Lydick received an Artium Baccalaureus degree from Stanford University in 1938 and a Juris Doctor from Stanford Law School in 1942. He was acting director of the Disputes Division of the Tenth Region of the National War Labor Board from 1942 to 1943. He was a United States Naval Reserve Lieutenant during World War II, from 1943 to 1946. He was an assistant to president and general counsel of United States Grant Export-Import, Ltd. in Los Angeles, California from 1946 to 1948. He was in private practice in Los Angeles from 1948 to 1971.

Federal judicial service

Lydick was nominated by President Richard Nixon on July 8, 1971, to a seat on the United States District Court for the Central District of California vacated by Judge Thurmond Clarke. He was confirmed by the United States Senate on July 29, 1971, and received his commission the same day. He assumed senior status on March 1, 1984 due to a certified disability. Lydick served in that capacity until his death on December 17, 1995, in Laguna Beach, California.

References

Sources
 

1916 births
1995 deaths
Judges of the United States District Court for the Central District of California
United States district court judges appointed by Richard Nixon
20th-century American judges
Stanford Law School alumni
United States Navy officers
20th-century American lawyers
United States Navy personnel of World War II